Aeolus Cave or Dorset Bat Cave is a cave located  up in the Taconic Mountains near East Dorset, Vermont, United States. Alternate names that have shown up in the literature include Aeolus Cave, Mount Aeolus Cave, and Dorset Bat Cave.

Before white nose syndrome reduced its bat population, Aeolus Bat Cave was noted for being the largest bat hibernaculum in the northeastern United States.

References

External links 
 Vermont Cavers' Association

Caves of Vermont
Landforms of Bennington County, Vermont